Consuelo "Connie" Stokes Milner (May 30, 1927 – September 4, 2020)  was an American scientist.

Early life
Consuelo originally worked in dress design prior to going into engineering.
Consuelo was a member of Phi Delta Kappa, education honor society.

Scientific career
Consuelo worked as an Electrical Engineer at the Brooklyn Navy Yard at the GS-12 level.  She received this promotion after 10 years of service. Conseulo was the first woman to hold that high of a position ever.  Her work was considered to be classified.   Consuelo's work also included Cryptography for the Naval Applied Science Lab.

Patent
Consuelo held a US patent to Thermally stabilized crystal units.  This was a method for producing electricity.

Later career
Consuelo later became a mathematics teacher.

References

African-American mathematicians
African-American schoolteachers
American computer scientists
American women mathematicians
20th-century American mathematicians
21st-century American mathematicians
American women computer scientists
American women physicists
20th-century American physicists
21st-century American physicists
20th-century American women scientists
21st-century American women scientists
20th-century women mathematicians
21st-century women mathematicians
20th-century American educators
20th-century American women educators
21st-century African-American people